Claiborne Hooper Phillips (July 11, 1847 – September 10, 1886) was the mayor of Nashville from 1883 to 1886. He was a graduate of Yale University, class of 1868, and was accidentally killed on a hunting trip in 1886. He was a member of the firm of Phillips, Jackson, & Company, a grocery store. He was married on July 8, 1869 to Mary C. Gentry.

References

1847 births
Mayors of Nashville, Tennessee
1886 deaths